Jean Chavannes Jeune is a Haitian Christian leader, pastor and evangelist, who was a candidate for president in the 2006 Haitian general election for the Christian National Union for the Reconstruction of Haiti. He finished in fourth position. He was a Vice President of Haiti in 1988–89.

Early life and education 
Born in Haiti on December 29, 1953, Chavannes Jeune grew up in an evangelistic household. His father Pastor Beauvil Jeune was a pioneer of the Mission Evangelique Baptiste du Sud d'Haiti (MEBSH). During a Vacation Bible School at age seven, Chavannes made his own personal commitment to Christ, followed by baptism at fourteen. In 1983, he studied  development and communications at Chicago Wheaton College. His postdoctoral studies were dedicated to theology, sociology and development administration at Columbia Bible School in North Carolina.

Religious activity 
Jeune served as the national leader for the MEBSH (Mission Evangélique Baptiste du Sud d'Haïti). He also was a leader of HAVIDEC (Haiti's Vision for the Third Century), an evangelical social organization. Jeune was elected as the leader of Christian National Union for the Reconstruction of Haiti in 2005 and was its presidential candidate for the 2006 elections.

He announced his candidacy for president in his hometown of Les Cayes on Wednesday, August 10, 2005. He is one of the advisor of Haiti's President Joseph Michel Martelly.

Political career 
Jeune served as Vice President of Haiti for thirteen months in 1988–89.

Personal life 
Jeune is married to Marie Lucie Carisma (a Business Administration specialist) with whom he was 4 children (3 sons and 1 daughter).

References

Living people
Christian National Union for the Reconstruction of Haiti politicians
Candidates for President of Haiti
Year of birth missing (living people)
Haitian Baptists
Haitian religious leaders